Hairmyres is an area of East Kilbride in South Lanarkshire, Scotland, situated on the west side of the town, close to the main road to Eaglesham and Kilmarnock (also with access to the major A726 Queensway/Glasgow South Orbital dual carriageway), and is  from the Glasgow City Council boundary at the Carmunnock Bypass and  south of the city centre of Glasgow.

Falling under the council's East Kilbride West ward, it gives its name to University Hospital Hairmyres, the general hospital for the town and surrounding area which originally opened in 1904, long before development as a designated new town after World War II.

 
Next to Hairmyres Station is the UK government's Department for International Development, the joint headquarters of which is at 22 Whitehall, London. DFID (formerly ODA) relocated part of its operation to this site1- in c.1980 following a government initiative to create employment in a region subject to major job losses following years of industrial decline.

The area now has a small shopping area known as The St James Retail Park. It is easily identifiable by its yellow and orange coloured walls. It hosts a few services such as eateries, a hairdresser and a vet.

References

External links 
Hairmyres Hospital, NHS Lanarkshire

Areas of East Kilbride